Robert E. Wilson (born January 15, 1951) is an American former professional basketball player. He played four seasons in the National Basketball Association (NBA) with the Chicago Bulls, Boston Celtics and Indiana Pacers.

Born in Indianapolis, Indiana, Wilson attended Wichita State University and Pasadena Community College and was selected by the Chicago Bulls with the 16th pick of the 3rd round in the 1974 NBA Draft.

References

External links
NBA stats at basketballreference.com

1951 births
Living people
African-American basketball players
American expatriate basketball people in France
American expatriate basketball people in Italy
American men's basketball players
Basketball coaches from Indiana
Basketball players from Indianapolis
Billings Volcanos players
Boston Celtics players
Chicago Bulls draft picks
Chicago Bulls players
Continental Basketball Association coaches
Fortitudo Pallacanestro Bologna players
Hawaii Volcanos players
Junior college men's basketball players in the United States
Indiana Pacers players
Pasadena City Lancers men's basketball players
Point guards
Wichita State Shockers men's basketball players
21st-century African-American people
20th-century African-American sportspeople